The  Washington Redskins season was the franchise's 28th season in the National Football League  The team failed to improve on their 4–7–1 record from 1958 and finished 3-9.

Offseason

NFL Draft

Regular season

Schedule

Standings

Personnel

Staff

Roster

Statistics

Passing

Rushing

Receiving

Awards and records

Milestones

External links
 1959 Washington Redskins at Pro-Football-Reference.com
 1959 Washington Redskins
 1959 Washington Redskins Highlight Film at youtube.com

References

Washington
Washington Redskins seasons
1959 in sports in Washington, D.C.